The Steagles were the team created by the temporary merger of Pennsylvania's two National Football League (NFL) teams, the Pittsburgh Steelers and the Philadelphia Eagles, during the 1943 season. The two franchises were compelled to field a single combined team because both had lost many players to military service during World War II. The league's official record book refers to the team as "Phil-Pitt Combine", but the unofficial "Steagles", despite never being registered by the NFL, has become the enduring moniker.

History
The prospect of a unified Pittsburgh-Philadelphia team actually predated World War II by several years. The Pennsylvania Keystoners were a team that was proposed in 1939, conceived with the intention of the Steelers and Eagles owners buying into one of the two teams, then spinning the other off to an ownership group in Boston, Massachusetts. League officials rejected the plan, though it resulted in a convoluted ownership "two-step" that left Eagles owner Bert Bell with a share in the Steelers franchise.

America entered World War II on December 7, 1941, with the Japanese attack on Pearl Harbor. Most of the young men who were of the age to play professional football were also of the age to fight for their country. Six hundred NFL players joined the armed forces.

With the country now at war, President Franklin D. Roosevelt esteemed entertainment and sports as a much-needed diversion. He issued an inspirational letter to Commissioner of Baseball Kenesaw Mountain Landis which focused on the importance of Major League Baseball to Americans' morale. The address made no mention of football, as baseball was still widely referred to as America's pastime and had not yet been surpassed in popularity by football. However at its 1943 annual spring meeting, the NFL decided to follow baseball's lead and continue play. Other football leagues, such as the 1940–41 American Football League, Dixie League and the American Association, decided to suspend operations instead, leaving the NFL and its West Coast counterpart, the Pacific Coast Professional Football League, as the only leagues playing professional football at the time.

Draft deferments
The young men who remained in the States to play football were mostly those who were deferred from the draft. The Steagles players were either unfit for military service for physical or dependency reasons, age, or were active servicemen who had obtained leave to play. Three types of draft deferments defined 1943 NFL players. The first group was called III-A. If a man had persons dependent upon him for support, such as a wife, parent, grandparent, brother, or sister, the draft board would not make him a priority until other possible candidates had been taken. In late 1943, with increasing manpower requirements, the government defined a man classified as III-A as a married father whose child or children was born or conceived prior to the attack on Pearl Harbor. The cutoff date for birth was September 15, 1942, precisely nine months and one week after Pearl Harbor. The second group of draft deferments, II-As, II-Bs, and II-Cs, consisted of those men who worked in critical civilian occupations, war industries producing and preparing ammunition, weapons and materials, or agriculture. The third group (IV-Fs), were those men deemed unfit for military service due to ailments such as chronic ulcers, improperly-healed injuries, defects of the extremities, bad hearing, and partial blindness.

Most NFL football players wanted to do their patriotic duty and serve their country, and for a man fit to play football, an IV-F classification was an embarrassment. One Steagle and future Hall of Famer, Bill Hewitt, quit in the middle of the season. He could not take the ridicule and subsequent guilt feelings anymore.  Hewitt was good enough to be inducted into the Pro Football Hall of Fame in 1971. However, the players were not making the decisions on who could or could not fight.

Many men could lead normal lives and even play football, but the military had deemed them unfit; numerous NFL players in 1943 had medical problems that kept them out of the military. Tony Bova, the Steagles' leading receiver with 17 receptions, was blind in one eye and partially blind in the other. Steagles guard Ed Michaels was nearly deaf and center Ray Graves was deaf in one ear. One starting defensive end was blind in one eye and nearly legally blind in the other. The Steagles tailback John Butler made his first start one day after being classified IV-F by his draft board for poor eyesight and bad knees.

1943 NFL spring meetings
Even with these deferments, NFL rosters were hurting. The Cleveland Rams suspended operations and the Pittsburgh Steelers had only six men left under contract while the Philadelphia Eagles had only sixteen. The 1943 NFL Draft did not help much. Most players drafted went off to the war instead of joining NFL teams. Further exacerbating the issue was the continued insistence of George Preston Marshall and other NFL owners on continuing the ten-year-old ban on black players, which disqualified potential replacement players such as Kenny Washington. The league nearly ceased operations before the 1943 season, but it continued. 

Steelers' owner Art Rooney knew that the league needed at least eight teams to survive. Rooney's idea was to merge the Steelers with the Eagles.  This idea came quickly to him since two years earlier he thought about combining the two teams into the Pennsylvania Keystoners. Eagles' owner Alexis Thompson, who was serving in the US Army as a corporal, was not as keen on the plan since he at least had 16 players under contract. However, Thompson remembered how Rooney in 1941 swapped cities with him which allowed him to keep the Eagles in Philadelphia close to his New York City home. This led to an agreement on combining the teams.

The league approved the merger by a vote of 5–4. However, several owners expressed fears that the merger would produce a team with an unfair advantage. The merger had a slight lean in favor of Philadelphia based on stipulations imposed by Thompson. The team would be known as the Philadelphia Eagles and be based in Philadelphia. Rooney had very little leverage, bringing only six players to the table. However, he was successful in landing two home games in Pittsburgh, while Philadelphia would host four. The team was also to wear the Eagles' green and white colors instead of Pittsburgh's black and gold. This event officially marked the only time in the Steelers history (other than in 1941 when green and white were used as well as black and gold) that the team colors were something other than black and gold. The league also stated that helmets were mandated for the first time and that the league would expand in 1944 with the Boston Yanks paying $50,000 for entry into the league.

1943 season

Philadelphia's Greasy Neale and Pittsburgh's Walt Kiesling would be co-head coaches because each coach refused to be demoted. This led to several problems: the first being that the two men hated each other. Secondly, Kiesling's own players did not like him; so asking the Eagles players to like him was too much to ask. However, Neale took advantage when Kiesling was delayed en route to camp which was held at St. Joseph's College in Philadelphia. By the time Keisling arrived, Neale already had the offense learning the T-formation, which was all the rage in those days because of its success in college football that was used by Frank Leahy at Notre Dame and by Red Blaik at Army. This conflict led to Neale serving as the team's offensive coordinator; while Kiesling served as the defensive coordinator. They would then split head coaching duties. According to defensive back Ernie Steele, the situation between the two coaches got so bad that Kiesling and Neale walked off the field after a heated argument during practice before a game. They returned for the game; but the players were nonetheless stunned. However, after the Steagles' in 1943 and Card-Pitt in 1944, Pittsburgh reverted to using the single-wing formation through 1952, becoming the last NFL team to ever use it as its primary offensive set.

Another difficult issue at the time was that the Steelers and Eagles were bitter intrastate rivals (much like the NHL's Pittsburgh Penguins-Philadelphia Flyers rivalry of today) and usually both teams ended up near the bottom of the standings each year. The Steagles were the only professional sports team where all the players held full-time war jobs as it was a requirement of the team. Playing football was seen as an extracurricular activity. All of the 22 players on the roster kept full-time jobs in defense plants. One of Pittsburgh's players, Ted Doyle, worked at Westinghouse Electric and figured out later that his work assisted the Manhattan Project, which was America's effort to build the first atomic bomb, according to Matthew Algeo's book Last Team Standing.

As the season got underway, fans and newspapers began calling the team the Steagles, a combination of Steelers and Eagles.  It had a nice ring to it and was fair to both cities. Steagles eventually became the common name used for the team throughout most of the country, except in Philadelphia, where the writers and even the team insisted on being called the Philadelphia Eagles. Chet Smith, the sports editor of the Pittsburgh Press, was initially the one who wrote in a column the moniker Steagles for the merged team, in a June 23, 1943 column.

Slowly, the team began to come together, and jumped out to a 2–0 start after defeating the Brooklyn Dodgers and New York Giants at Shibe Park. Against New York, the Steagles fumbled ten times (still an NFL record as of 2021), but managed to win 28–14. The team stumbled on the road, though, and after seven games sported a 3–3–1 mark, with their third win and the tie coming against the defending-champion Washington Redskins; the team regrouped with two at Pittsburgh's Forbes Field, against the Chicago Cardinals on Halloween Night and over the Detroit Lions on Nov. 21. Going into the season's final week, the 5-3-1 Steagles, with still a shot at the division championship, met Don Hutson and the Green Bay Packers in front of 35,000 fans at Shibe Park. Green Bay would go on to win the game 38–28, however, putting Phil-Pitt at 5-4-1, one game behind Washington and New York.

Aftermath

Legacy
The Steagles 1943 season was the Philadelphia franchise's first winning season in its history and the second for Pittsburgh's.

The next season, 1944, the NFL was back on solid footing. The Army had declared that it had enough soldiers and men over 26 years of age would not be drafted, though the league had another problem. With the Cleveland Rams back in operation, the expansion Boston Yanks team in the fold and the Eagles and Steelers back in their separate ways, the NFL had 11 teams, which created a nightmare with divisions and scheduling. NFL Commissioner Elmer Layden begged for two teams to combine again in 1944. Ten teams made for a perfect league and eleven seemed impossible. The Steelers were still short of players due to the war. Pittsburgh owner Art Rooney was unhappy with the "Phil-Pitt" arrangement, but wanted to keep it intact. However, Philadelphia refused. The team merged with the Chicago Cardinals for the 1944 season, creating a team known as Card-Pitt. This "Card-Pitt" team was derisively called "carpet" due to going winless, and the commentary that "every team walked all over them". The war ended by the time the 1945 NFL season started, and with the Brooklyn Tigers and the aforementioned Boston franchise permanently merging, there was an even number of ten teams to the delight of owners.

The Eagles, now having enough players back from the war, resumed their traditional operation and continued under Neale, who took home back-to-back coach of the year awards as Philadelphia won consecutive NFL championships in 1948 and 1949.

Individually, the Steagles' Jack Hinkle ended the season with 571 rushing yards. He lost the rushing title to New York's Bill Paschal by one yard. Against those very Giants Hinkle was not given credit for a 37-yard run (they gave it to John Butler). Hinkle did not complain about not winning the NFL rushing crown. Tony Bova, a half-blind 4-F, led the team in receiving with 417 yards.

In popular culture
The 1971 film The Steagle starring Richard Benjamin takes its name from the Steagles football team. In the opening scene, the protagonist of the film, a bookish college professor, explains the history and meaning of the term to a pair of loudly arguing sports fans on a commuter train, and draws an admiring look from an attractive Asian woman who is a fellow passenger. The film concerns the personality change which overcomes the protagonist during the Cuban Missile Crisis of 1962, and the film's title implicitly references the transient nature of the Steagles team, existing for only one brief season during a national crisis.

60th anniversary
The Steelers celebrated the 60th anniversary of the Steagles on August 17, 2003, during the pregame and halftime ceremonies at Heinz Field.

Six of the nine surviving members of that team were honored at halftime. Those members were quarterback Allie Sherman, running back and defensive back Ernie Steele, center Ray Graves, and tackles Al Wistert, Vic Sears, and Bucko Kilroy. End Tom Miller, tackle Ted Doyle and halfback John Hinkle were unable to attend.  Wistert was the last surviving player of the combine and died in 2016. All three of the surviving players belonged to the Eagles. Ted Doyle, who died in 2006, was the last surviving Steeler player from the team.

In addition the Steelers recreated the Steagles era in their "Turn Back the Clock" ceremonies, including broadcasting in black and white on the Jumbotron and airing World War II footage during the national anthem. All live entertainment reflected the 1940s. During the festivities the Steelers gave each of the six members a replica Steagles jersey to wear. The jerseys worn by honorees were later given back to the Steelers and sold to help benefit a local charity. The Steelers also painted the south end zone in plain diagonal white lines, a common practice in the NFL until the 1960s. The Steelers later kept the "plain" design in the south end zone permanently. The Eagles won the game 21–16.

Draft

Player selections
The table shows the Eagles selections and the Steelers selections and what picks they had that were traded away and the team that ended up with that pick. It is possible their pick ended up with this team via another team with whom they made a trade.
Not shown are acquired picks that were traded away.

Exhibitions

Regular season

Schedule

Standings

Game summaries

Week 1: vs. Brooklyn Dodgers 

The Steagles held the Dodgers to minus 33 rushing yards; this was the second lowest rushing total posted by a single team in an NFL game to that point. It currently ranks as the third-lowest rushing output in league history.

Week 2: vs. New York Giants 

Despite setting a league record by fumbling the ball ten times, the Steagles overcame the Giants on the strength of three fourth-quarter touchdowns. The mark of ten fumbles in a game by one team has since been matched three times, but it has never been topped.

Week 3: at Chicago Bears

Week 4: at New York Giants

Week 5: vs. Chicago Cardinals

Week 6: vs. Washington Redskins 

The 1942 NFL Champion Washington Redskins come to Philadelphia with a 13 regular season game winning streak, and for 1943 scoring an avg of 30 points per game and allowing on 6 a game.

Week 7: at Brooklyn Dodgers

Week 8: vs. Detroit Lions

Week 9: at Washington Redskins

Week 10: vs. Green Bay Packers

Roster

References

Sources
 Algeo, Matthew (2006), Last Team Standing: How the Steelers and the Eagles—"The Steagles"—Saved Pro Football During World War II. Philadelphia: Da Capo Press.

Further reading
 Coenen, Craig R. (2005), From sandlots to the Super Bowl: the National Football League, 1920–1967. Knoxville, TN: The University of Tennessee Press. 
 DeVito, Carlo (2006). Wellington: the Maras, the Giants, and the City of New York. Chicago: Triumph Books. 
 Didinger, Ray; with Lyons, Robert S. (2005), The Eagles Encyclopedia. Philadelphia: Temple University Press. 
 Hession, Joseph (1987). The Rams : Five Decades of Football. San Francisco: Foghorn Press.
 Layden, Elmer; with Snyder, Ed (1969). It Was a Different Game: The Elmer Layden Story. Englewood Cliffs, NJ:Prentice-Hall, Inc.
 Lyons, Robert S. (2010). On Any Given Sunday, A Life of Bert Bell. Philadelphia: Temple University Press. 
 MacCambridge, Michael (2005), America's Game. New York: Anchor Books 
 Rooney, Dan; with Halaas, David F. and Masich, Andrew E. (2007). My 75 Years with the Pittsburgh Steelers and the NFL. Cambridge, MA: Da Capo Press. 
 Ruck, Rob; with Paterson, Maggie Jones and Weber, Michael P. (2010) Rooney: A Sporting Life. Lincoln, Neb.: University of Nebraska Press.

External links
 Steagles: When the Steelers and Eagles were One in the Same
 Steagles to be Honored
 Blood Brothers: The 1943 Steagles became an unlikely product of the war years
 The 'Steagles,' a ragtag NFL team that involved Greasy Neale
 World War II Steagles to be honored at tonight's game
 Fox Sports on MSN: Amazing Sports Stories
 The Steagles: Hybrid Team Zany Moment in Steelers' Past

 
Defunct National Football League teams
Defunct Pittsburgh sports teams
American football teams established in 1943
American football teams disestablished in 1943
Pittsburgh Steelers
1943 Pittsburgh
1943 Philadelphia
Defunct American football teams in Pennsylvania
Philadelphia Eagles
1943 in sports in Pennsylvania
1943 National Football League season